Infinite Girls (also known as Muhan Girls) is a Korean variety program. The program is an all-female version of Infinite Challenge. The show consisted of three seasons with six MCs as its mascots. The show reached the peak of its popularity in November 2009 so it got two more seasons.

Seasons
Season 1 (October 15, 2007 – November 27, 2009)
Season 2 (December 4, 2009 – August 27, 2010)
Season 3 (December 9, 2010 – November 25, 2013)

References

Girls
Television spin-offs
South Korean variety television shows
South Korean reality television series
2007 South Korean television series debuts
2010 South Korean television series endings
2010s South Korean television series